The table tennis competition at the 2000 Summer Olympics consisted of four events.

Participating nations
A total of 171 athletes (86 men and 85 women), representing 48 NOCs, competed in four events.

Medal summary

Medal table

References

Sources
 Official Olympic Report
 International Table Tennis Federation (ITTF)
 

 
2000 Summer Olympics events
2000
2000 in table tennis